Mark Coreth (born 1958) is a British artist.

Biography
Mark Coreth was born in London in 1958 and was immediately dispatched to the family farm in the Kenyan highlands where the Equator ran through the house.  Black and white colobus monkeys leapt amongst the branches in the trees behind the house where leopard and cheetah also lived.  This idyllic childhood fostered Mark's early and continuing passion for wildlife.

After prep school in Kenya, Mark attended Ampleforth and on leaving joined The Blues and Royals, serving with the Regiment as a regular officer.  He has spent time in England, Cyprus, Germany, Northern Ireland and the Falkland Islands during the 1982 hostilities.  On his return to England he was commissioned to make a silver sculpture of his regiment's drum horse "Belisarius", for the Warrant Officer's Mess and later a second cast in bronze became the Household Cavalry's wedding present to The Duke and Duchess of York; his first commission, a taste of many more to come in the following years.

Whilst Mark has had no formal art training his ability is based quite simply on dedication and hard work coupled with an acute and perceptive eye, drawing heavily on experiences gained during his early years in Kenya.  Mark's sculptures reflect his instinctive understanding of the moods of the animals he sculpts.  Working with extraordinary speed, if the original plasticine or clay fails to speak to him within a couple of hours Mark destroys it and starts again.  He captures violence, speed, tranquillity and pathos with deceptive ease, and is now internationally recognised as a master sculptor of the animal in motion.

His specially commissioned work includes a pair of lifesize Cheetah in a bronze tree for the ruling family of Dubai, a large figure for the re-launch of Shakespeare's Globe Theatre, and the monumental Millennium sculpture "The Waterhole" at The Natural History Museum which incorporates over 50 animals.  Unusually for an artist he enjoys the challenge of a commission so there are many more public and private pieces all around the world.

The Coreth one-man exhibitions at the Sladmore continue to be exciting bi-annual events with the frenzied attendance and resulting sales the talk of the art world.  In between, he has regular foreign shows including Paris, New York and Sydney, and most importantly leaves himself time to fit in trips around the world for inspiration.

Ice Bear Project
The Ice Bear Project is a not-for-profit arts organisation, inspired by Mark Coreth. Mark witnessed the effects of climate change when he first travelled to Baffin Island during November 2007. Mark knew that few will ever experience the Arctic, but realised that he could bring the Arctic to everyone in the form of an Ice Bear sculptural event.

Collections
The following people all have works by Mark Coreth in their collections:
The Queen
The Duke and Duchess of York
The Sultan of Brunei
The Ruling Family, Dubai, UAE
The Earl and Countess of Halifax
The Marquess of Hartington
Sir Anthony Bamford
Sir Christopher Lever
Mary, Lady Fairfax
The Natural History Museum, London
The Globe Theatre, London
Anthony Garnett, London

References

External links

The Sladmore Gallery
About Mark Coreth
Mark's Home page
The Ice Bear Project

1958 births
Living people
People educated at Ampleforth College
English artists
Blues and Royals officers
British Army personnel of the Falklands War